Bhadawar Vidya Mandir PG College is situated at Bah on Agra Etawah Road, Agra, Uttar Pradesh, India. The organization was born in 1942 with the support of the enthusiastic public. college is providing Graduation & Post Graduation Education. The Building is spread over 3500 Sq. Meter.

In the present time, Dr. Sukesh Kumar is appointed as Principal by the Committee, To Facilitate Student. Especially Girls for Graduation level the College has affiliated for Home Science and Co-Education Level for B. Ed and Post Graduation level for education and Hindi Subject in the year 2004–05.

Bhadawar Vidya Mandir PG College Central Library is on a sprawling 1575 sq.m. with all the modern facilities such as state of the art Library Security Systems.

External links
 http://bvmcollegebah.com/

Postgraduate colleges in Uttar Pradesh
Universities and colleges in Agra
1942 establishments in India
Educational institutions established in 1942